The Philip Morris International was a professional team golf tournament, played from 1972 and 1976. The 1972 and 1973 tournaments were called the Marlboro Nations' Cup. There was no tournament in 1974 but the event was played in 1975 and 1976 under a different name. All events were played in France. The tournament had a knock-out format with up to 16 teams competing. There were two players in each team, each match consisting of a foursomes followed by two singles matches.

The 1972 event was played at Mandelieu-la-Napoule near Cannes, the 1973 and 1975 events were played at Hardelot near Boulogne in northern France. In 1976 it was played at Divonne-les-Bains on the Swiss border near Geneva.

In 1972 and 1973 all the team were European, with the exception of Morocco who competed in 1972. Australia and South Africa competed in 1975 and they were joined by the  United States, Argentina and New Zealand in 1976.

Winners

1972
Source:

Teams

Results

1973

Teams

Results

1975
Source:

Teams

Results

1976
Source:

Teams

Results

References

Team golf tournaments
Defunct golf tournaments in France